Whizzer is the name of several fictional characters appearing in American comic books published by Marvel Comics. The first character debuted during the Golden Age in USA Comics #1 (Aug. 1941), and was reintroduced in Giant-Size Avengers #1 (Aug. 1974). A second villainous version debuts during the Silver Age in The Avengers #69 (Oct. 1969), and a second heroic version debuting in The Avengers #85 (Feb. 1971).

The Whizzer appeared in the second season of the Marvel Cinematic Universe television series Jessica Jones, portrayed by Jay Klaitz.

Publication history
The first character named the Whizzer first appeared during the Golden Age of comics, and later appeared briefly during the Silver Age.

The second, villainous version appears in the final panel of The Avengers #69 (Oct. 1969), the first chapter of a three-issue storyline by writer Roy Thomas and penciller Sal Buscema. The story arc introduced the supervillain team the Squadron Sinister, whose four members were loosely based on heroes in DC Comics' Justice League of America, with the Whizzer based on the Flash.

Fictional character biographies

Golden Age

Silver Age

The Squadron Sinister are created by the cosmic entity the Grandmaster to battle the Avengers, who are the champions of the time-traveling Kang. The Whizzer, James Sanders, battles Avenger Goliath, but the fight is interrupted by the Black Knight. The Avengers eventually defeat the Squadron, who are abandoned by the Grandmaster. The Squadron reappear in the title The Defenders, reunited by the alien Nebulon. The villains receive greater power in exchange for the planet Earth, and create a giant laser cannon in the Arctic to melt the polar ice caps, thereby covering the entirety of the Earth's surface in water. The Defenders prevent the scheme and defeat the villains (and Nebulon); Namor the Sub-Mariner humiliates the Whizzer.

Afterward the Whizzer and his two remaining teammates are teleported off world by Nebulon, returning with an energy-draining weapon. The Squadron Sinister plan to threaten the Earth again but are defeated once more by the Defenders and the Avenger Yellowjacket. The character has another brief encounter with several members of the Avengers, who seek a way to separate the Power Prism of Doctor Spectrum from fellow Avenger the Wasp. The Whizzer disassociates himself from the Squadron Sinister and adopts a new costume and alias, Speed Demon.

Bronze Age

Roy Thomas and penciller John Buscema created an alternate-universe team of heroes called the Squadron Supreme, who debut in Avengers #85 (Feb. 1971). After an initial skirmish with four Avengers, the teams unite to stop a common threat. The characters including the Whizzer, whose name is Stanley Stewart, were identical in name and appearance to the Squadron Sinister, which caused confusion in Marvel's production department, as the covers of The Avengers #85 and #141 (Nov. 1975) "cover-blurbed" appearances by the Squadron Sinister, when in fact it was the Squadron Supreme that appeared in both issues.

As a result of exposure to the mutagenic effects of a fogbank of unknown nature, Stanley Stewart possesses superhuman speed, stamina, and reflexes. When moving at subsonic speed, the Stewart Whizzer can create cyclones (by running in circles); run up walls and across water. The character has limited immunity to the effects of friction (Stewart wears goggles to protect his eyes), although still generates normal fatigue poisons. As a result, Stewart must consume large amounts of calories and rest after using his superhuman speed powers extensively.

The heroic Whizzer and the Squadron Supreme have another series of skirmishes with the Avengers engineered by the group the Serpent Cartel, but eventually team together and prevent the use of the artifact the Serpent Crown.  The character and his teammates briefly feature in the title Thor, when the evil version of Hyperion attacks the Earth-712 version and then Thunder God Thor. The Squadron are mind-controlled by the entities the Over-Mind and Null the Living Darkness, but are freed by the Defenders and aid the heroes in defeating the villains.

The character features with the Squadron Supreme in a self-titled 12-issue miniseries (Sept. 1985 – Aug. 1986) by writer Mark Gruenwald. The series also explains why there are the Squadrons Sinister and Supreme are similar: the Grandmaster creates the Squadron Sinister modelled on the already-existing Squadron Supreme of the Earth-712 universe. 
Gruenwald, Ryan, and inker Al Williamson created a graphic-novel sequel which maroons the team in the mainstream Marvel universe. The Whizzer and teammates encounter the hero Quasar, and relocate to the government facility Project Pegasus. After another encounter with the Overmind and a visit to the laboratory world of the Stranger; the Whizzer participates in a "speedster" race organized by Elder of the Universe the Runner attempts (with the Squadron) to return to their universe  and with fellow members Hyperion and Doctor Spectrum battle the entity Deathurge.

The entire Squadron Supreme appear in a two-part story with the Avengers that finally returns them to their home universe, where they disband for a time. The Whizzer rejoins his teammates to aid the interdimensional team the Exiles.

Modern Age

The mature-audience Marvel MAX imprint showcases the adventures of the Earth-31916 version of the Whizzer, the Atlanta Blur. Also named Stanley Stewart, the character is a young African-American man who develops super-speed as a result of exposure to an alien retrovirus. He initially hides his ability, with the "Atlanta Blur" regarded as an urban legend, but when Hyperion is publicly revealed Stewart also goes public, becoming a celebrity with numerous endorsements. As the Blur, he reluctantly fights crime at the request of Nighthawk.

Squadron Supreme of America
A variation of the Stanley Stewart version of Blur appears as a member of the Squadron Supreme of America. This version is a simulacrum created by Mephisto and programmed by the Power Elite. Stanley was programmed to forcefully watch endless loops to keep up his brain speed while watching numerous S.H.I.E.L.D. files and unscrupulous videos. In his personal time, he works as a computer programmer at an office building in Washington DC.

In the team's first mission, Whizzer and the Squadron Supreme of America fought Namor and the Defenders of the Deep, when they targeted a Roxxon oil platform off the coast of Alaska.

Soon after, the Squadron Supreme visited another oil platform in the Gulf of Mexico. The Squadron Supreme then made short work of Namor and the Defenders of the Deep.<ref>Free Comic Book Day 2019 #Avengers. Marvel Comics.</ref>

During the War of the Realms storyline, Stanley was working at his desk until he and the other members of the Squadron Supreme of America were summoned to Washington D.C., where Phil Coulson brought them up to speed with Malekith the Accursed's invasion. Blur and the Squadron Supreme of America fight an army of Rock Trolls and Frost Giants. After the Squadron Supreme caused the Frost Giants to retreat, Phil Coulson sends them to Ohio, which has become a battleground.

Blur was with the Squadron Supreme when they attempted to apprehend Black Panther, after he infiltrated the Pentagon to confront Phil Coulson.

Powers and abilities
Each of the Whizzers possess superhuman speed.

In other media

 The Robert Frank incarnation of the Whizzer appears in the Spider-Man five-part episode "Six Forgotten Warriors", voiced by Walker Edmiston.
 The Robert Frank incarnation of the Whizzer appears in the Ultimate Spider-Man episode "S.H.I.E.L.D. Academy", voiced by Robert Patrick.
 The James Sanders incarnation of Speed Demon appears in Avengers Assemble, voiced by Jason Spisak.
 An original incarnation of the Whizzer named Robert Coleman appears in the second season of Jessica Jones'', portrayed by Jay Klaitz. This version is heavily based on Robert Frank and got his powers after the biotech clinic IGH experimented on him. Introduced in the episode "AKA Start at the Beginning", Coleman comes to Jessica Jones twice, claiming to have abilities and that someone is after him. When he returns a third time, Jones witnesses him using his powers as he rushes outside and is killed by falling construction debris. In the episode "AKA Freak Accident", Jones investigates his apartment and finds a video log of Coleman trying to get in touch with Trish Walker.

References

External links
 Whizzer (Stanley Stewart) at Marvel.cim
 Grand Comics Database
 World of Black Heroes: Blur Biography
 The Unofficial Handbook of Marvel Comics Creators
 Don Markstein's Toonopedia: The Squadron Supreme
 IGN.com (Oct. 10, 2003): "Comics in Context" (column) #14: "Continuity/Discontinuity: Straczynski's Supreme Power, Mark Gruenwald, and JLA / Avengers", by Peter Sanderson

Articles about multiple fictional characters
Comics characters introduced in 1969
Comics characters introduced in 1971
Fictional African-American people
Marvel Comics characters who can move at superhuman speeds
Marvel Comics mutates
Squadron Supreme
Vigilante characters in comics